Aloeides gowani, the Gowan's copper, is a butterfly of the family Lycaenidae. It is found in South Africa, where it is known from the Western, Eastern and the Northern Cape.

The wingspan is 25–29 mm for males and 28–30 mm females. Adults are on wing from October to April, with a peak from December to February There are multiple generations during midsummer.

The larvae feed on Aspalathus species.

References

Butterflies described in 1968
Aloeides
Endemic butterflies of South Africa